

Pallor mortis (Latin: pallor "paleness", mortis "of death"), the first stage of death, is an after-death paleness that occurs in those with light/white skin. An opto-electronical colour measurement device is used to measure pallor mortis on bodies.

Timing and applicability
Pallor mortis occurs almost immediately, generally within 15–25 minutes, after death. Paleness develops so rapidly after death that it has little to no use in determining the time of death, aside from saying that it either happened less than 30 minutes ago or more, which could help if the body were found very soon after death.

Cause
Pallor mortis results from the collapse of capillary circulation throughout the body. Gravity then causes the blood to sink down into the lower parts of the body, creating livor mortis.

Similar paleness in living persons
A living person can look deathly pale, with such paleness often likened to death in figurative speech and in fiction. This can happen when blood escapes from the surface of the skin, in a matter of deep shock. Also heart failure (insufficientia cordis) can make the face appear pale; the person then might have blue lips. Skin can also become pale as a result of vasoconstriction as part of the body's homeostatic systems in cold conditions, or if the skin is deficient in vitamin D, as seen in people who spend most of the time indoors, away from sunlight.

References

Signs of death
Latin medical words and phrases
Forensic pathology